November 22 - Eastern Orthodox liturgical calendar - November 24

All fixed commemorations below are observed on December 6 by Eastern Orthodox Churches on the Old Calendar.

For November 23, Orthodox Churches on the Old Calendar commemorate the Saints listed on November 10.

Feasts

 Afterfeast of the Entry of the Most Holy Theotokos into the Temple.

Saints

 Martyr Myrope of Chios, under Decius (251)  (see also: December 2 )
 Saint Sisinius the Confessor, Bishop of Cyzicus (c. 325)
 Venerable Ischyrion, Bishop in Egypt and hermit of Scete.
 Venerable Helenus, Bishop of Tarsus.
 Martyr Theodore of Antioch (after 363)
 Saint Amphilochius of Iconium, Bishop of Iconium (394)
 Saint Gregory, Bishop of Agrigentum, Sicily (690)

Pre-Schism Western saints

 Saint Clement I, one of the Seventy Apostles, he was the third Pope of Rome (c. 101)  (see also: Jan 4, Apr 22, Sept 10 and Nov 25 - East)
 Saint Felicity, a widow martyred with her sons either in Rome or else in North Africa under Decius, buried in Rome (c. 165)  (see also: January 25 - East)
 Virgin-martyr Lucretia, in Mérida in the west of Spain (306)
 Saint Paternian, Bishop of Fano in Italy (c. 343)
 Saint Clement, first Bishop of Metz in the east of France.
 Saint Paulinus of Wales (Polin, Pewlin, Paulhen), an Abbot in Wales and disciple of St Illtyd, founder of the monastery of Whitland (c. 505)
 Saint Columbanus, Irish missionary and founder of Luxeuil Abbey and Bobbio Abbey (615)  (see also: November 21)
 Saint Wilfetrudis, second Abbess of Nivelles in Belgium, founded by her aunt St Gertrude (c. 670)
 Venerable Trudo (Trudon, Tron, Trond, Truyen, Trudjen), Abbot, of Zirkingen (c. 695)
 Saint Rachildis, an anchoress who lived near the monastery of St Gall in Switzerland (c. 946)
 Saint Adalbert, a monk at Cassoria in the Abruzzi in Italy, founder of the monastery of St Nicholas on Mt Caramanico near Chieti (c. 1045)
 Saint Guy of Casauria, a monk at Farfa who became Abbot of Casauria Abbey near Chieti in Italy (1045)

Post-Schism Orthodox saints

 Saint Amphilochius of the Kiev Caves, Bishop of Vladimir, Volhynia (1122)  (see also: August 28 )
 Burial of Saint Alexander Nevsky (in schema Alexis), Grand Prince of Novgorod (1263)
 Saint Dionysius I, Patriarch of Constantinople, "the Wise" (1492)
 Saint Metrophanes (in schema Macarius), Bishop of Voronezh (1703)
 Saint Anthony of lezeru-Vilcea, Romania (1714)

New martyrs and confessors

 New Hieromartyr Seraphim (Tievar), Hieromonk, of Moscow (1931)
 Saint John Vasiliev, Confessor (1932)
 New Hieromartyr Boris (Voskoboinikov), Bishop of Ivanovo (1937)
 New Hieromartyr Eleazar Spyridonov of Eupatoria, Priest, first rector of the Greek Church of St. Elijah (Yevpatoria) in Crimea (1937)
 Martyr Alexander Uksusov of Yaroslavl-Rostov (1937)
 New Hieomartyr Archimandrite Gregory (Peradze) of Georgia, who suffered in Auschwitz, Poland (1942)

Icon gallery

Notes

References

Sources
 November 23 / December 6. Orthodox Calendar (PRAVOSLAVIE.RU).
 December 6 / November 23. Holy Trinity Russian Orthodox Church (A parish of the Patriarchate of Moscow).
 November 23. OCA - The Lives of the Saints.
 The Autonomous Orthodox Metropolia of Western Europe and the Americas (ROCOR). St. Hilarion Calendar of Saints for the year of our Lord 2004. St. Hilarion Press (Austin, TX). p. 88.
 The Twenty-Third Day of the Month of November. Orthodoxy in China.
 November 23. Latin Saints of the Orthodox Patriarchate of Rome.
 The Roman Martyrology. Transl. by the Archbishop of Baltimore. Last Edition, According to the Copy Printed at Rome in 1914. Revised Edition, with the Imprimatur of His Eminence Cardinal Gibbons. Baltimore: John Murphy Company, 1916. p. 361-362.
 Rev. Richard Stanton. A Menology of England and Wales, or, Brief Memorials of the Ancient British and English Saints Arranged According to the Calendar, Together with the Martyrs of the 16th and 17th Centuries. London: Burns & Oates, 1892. pp. 562-563.
Greek Sources
 Great Synaxaristes:  23 ΝΟΕΜΒΡΙΟΥ. ΜΕΓΑΣ ΣΥΝΑΞΑΡΙΣΤΗΣ.
  Συναξαριστής. 23 Νοεμβρίου. ECCLESIA.GR. (H ΕΚΚΛΗΣΙΑ ΤΗΣ ΕΛΛΑΔΟΣ). 
  23/11/2015. Ορθόδοξος Συναξαριστής. 
Russian Sources
  6 декабря (23 ноября). Православная Энциклопедия под редакцией Патриарха Московского и всея Руси Кирилла (электронная версия). (Orthodox Encyclopedia - Pravenc.ru).
  23 ноября по старому стилю / 6 декабря по новому стилю. Русская Православная Церковь - Православный церковный календарь на 2018 год.

November in the Eastern Orthodox calendar